Lalhmangaiha (born 17 November 1983) is an Indian cricketer. He made his List A debut on 2 October 2018, for Mizoram in the 2018–19 Vijay Hazare Trophy. He made his first-class debut on 1 November 2018, for Mizoram in the 2018–19 Ranji Trophy. He made his Twenty20 debut on 27 February 2019, also for Mizoram, in the 2018–19 Syed Mushtaq Ali Trophy.

References

External links
 

1983 births
Living people
Indian cricketers
Mizoram cricketers
Place of birth missing (living people)